Birds of a Feather is a 1936 British comedy film directed by John Baxter and starring George Robey, Horace Hodges and Eve Lister. The screenplay concerns a sausage-making tycoon who rents a castle from an impoverished aristocrat. It was adapted from the play A Rift in the Loot by George Foster. It was made at Shepperton Studios as a quota quickie.

Cast
 George Robey as Henry Wortle
 Horace Hodges as Lord Cheverton
 Eve Lister as Lady Susan
 Jack Melford as Rudolph
 Veronica Brady as Mrs. Wortle
 Julian Royce as Warrington
 C. Denier Warren as Taylor
 Diana Beaumont as May Wortle
 Ian Wilson as Peter
 Fred Hearne as Herbert
 Billy Percy as Horace
 Sebastian Shaw as Jack Wortle
 Charles Mortimer as Sir Michael

References

Bibliography
 Chibnall, Steve. Quota Quickies: The Birth of the British 'B' Film. British Film Institute, 2007.
 Low, Rachael. Filmmaking in 1930s Britain. George Allen & Unwin, 1985.
 Wood, Linda. British Films, 1927-1939. British Film Institute, 1986.

External links

1936 films
1936 comedy films
British comedy films
1930s English-language films
Films directed by John Baxter
Films shot at Shepperton Studios
Quota quickies
Films set in England
British black-and-white films
1930s British films